Lunacy may refer to:

 Lunacy, the condition suffered by a lunatic, now used only informally
 Lunacy (film), a 2005 Jan Švankmajer film
 Lunacy (video game), a video game for the Sega Saturn video game console
 Luna Sea, a Japanese rock band originally named Lunacy
 Lunacy (album), their 2000 album
 The following of the Roman goddess Luna, a variation of the Greek goddess Selene
 Lunacy (FIRST), the name of the FIRST Robotics Competition 2009 game
 Luna-C (born 1973), British DJ and record producer

See also
 Luna (disambiguation)
 Lunatic (disambiguation)